James Desmarais (born May 4, 1979) is a Canadian professional ice hockey player.

Desmarais was selected by the St. Louis Blues in the 9th round (270th overall) of the 1999 NHL Entry Draft. Though he never played in the National Hockey League, he played for several teams in the minor leagues such as the American Hockey League and the ECHL as well as for teams in Italy, Austria, Switzerland and the United Kingdom. In Switzerland, he played for HC Ajoie from 2006 to 2013. In 2015, he signed for the Belfast Giants in the Elite Ice Hockey League and remained until 2017.

Career statistics

References

External links

1979 births
Living people
Adirondack IceHawks players
Arkansas RiverBlades players
B.C. Icemen players
Belfast Giants players
Dayton Bombers players
EHC Biel players
EHC Black Wings Linz players
Greensboro Generals players
HC Ajoie players
HC Alleghe players
Innsbrucker EV players
Laval Titan Collège Français players
Les Pétroliers du Nord players
Peoria Rivermen (AHL) players
Reading Royals players
Rouyn-Noranda Huskies players
SC Rapperswil-Jona Lakers players
Ice hockey people from Montreal
Springfield Falcons players
St. Louis Blues draft picks
Verdun Dragons players
Canadian expatriate ice hockey players in Northern Ireland
Canadian expatriate ice hockey players in Austria
Canadian expatriate ice hockey players in Italy
Canadian expatriate ice hockey players in Switzerland
Canadian expatriate ice hockey players in the United States
Canadian ice hockey centres